Vitalac is a village in the Nikšić municipality of Montenegro. Once a separate settlement, the westbound expansion of Nikšić over the years means that Vitalac forms part of a conurbation with the larger city. The village is located along the main road to Montenegro's border crossings with Bosnia and Herzegovina (one for Trebinje and the other for Bileća).

External links 
Location

Populated places in Nikšić Municipality